Sigma International English School was established in 2052 B.S. Nabaraj Parajuli is the founder of this school. It started providing education from 2052 B.S. This school is located at Parakhopi, Haldibari, Nepal. The school gives education up to class 10. The school has two buildings with three floors.

See also
Haldibari Higher Secondary School

Schools in Nepal